Moghandar may refer to:
 Moghandar, Isfahan (مغاندر - Moghāndar)